Frank Ammerlaan (born 1979 in Sassenheim) is a Dutch artist who lives and works in London.

Biography 
Ammerlaan graduated as an independent artist from the Gerrit Rietveld Academie in Amsterdam in 2007. In 2012 he graduated in fine art at the Royal College of Art in London with paintings, sculptures and photography. For his graduation show Ammerlaan won The Land Securities Studio Award. In 2012 he received the Royal Award for Painting, which is handed to the most promising young Dutch painter of that year. From 2012, Ammerlaan also makes video art. Ammerlaan experiments with unusual materials, like galvanised and passivated metals and pulverized meteorite. He exhibited in several museums and galleries in the Netherlands and abroad.

Ammerlaan is one of the founders of the exhibition spaces Horse Move Project Space (2004) and De Service Garage (2007), both situated in Amsterdam. Currently De Service Garage is giving space to seven artists and is run by Benjamin Roth and Daniel Hofstede.

Work 
Most characteristic for Ammerlaan's work are his monumental colorful paintings. His oeuvre includes works in which subtle stains of color appear on an otherwise black canvas. The surface seems to be calm from afar, but when you approach it subtly changes.

Ammerlaan's work does not try to provoke emotions. The emphasis lies in showing barely perceptible changes. Another series of colorful paintings are embroidered with thin, shiny, sometimes fluorescent threads, which frame and structure the surface. The fragile threads change color with changing light and sometimes seem to fade into the background. The geometrical patterns of thread create a permeable fence, like a web or weave which you can seemingly get stuck in or hold onto. These works are illuminating and seductive though ultimately deny the viewer access.

In the recent years Frank Ammerlaan has diversified his practice to include sculpture, photography and video. Painting, however, remains his most important medium. His series of small sensitive sculptures, made of different types of conductive metal, form repetitive geometric shapes originating from aerial and antenna structures. The sculptures suggest a biomimicry-related language ready to receive and transmit signals and information.

In 2010 Ammerlaan developed a practice of painting with chemicals. Having done research for a number of years with chemists and scientists he physicalized the phenomenal aesthetics of organic color arrangements – visible on a rainy urban day – in the form of oil spills. The result is extremely detailed, holographic but toxic, and becomes noxious in our contemporary political context.

More work:

Prizes and scholarships 
 2013 The Scheffer Award
 2013 Residency Fondazione MACC Museo d'Arte Conteporanea in Calasetta, Italy
 2012 Land Securities prize
 2012 Doha Studio Art prize
 2012 Royal Award for Painting
 2011 Nomination Royal Award for Painting
 2010 Nomination Royal Award for Painting
 2010 Fund BKVB abroad scholarship (till 2012)
 2010 Hendrik Muller Fund
 2009 Nomination Royal Award for Painting
 2009 Scholarship Fund BKVB
 2009 Foundation Niemeijer fund
 2007 Gerrit Rietveld Academie Award for Painting

Exhibitions (selection) 
2017
 Particles of Dust, solo exhibition at Upstream Gallery in Amsterdam
 Drawing Biënnale, Londen
2016
 MOONLESS , solo exhibition at Bosse & Baum Gallery, Londen
 Sparkling like the surface of the ocean at night, Garage Rotterdam, Rotterdam
 AKZO NOBEL Art Foundation, Amsterdam
2015
 Outside the Wireframe, SIM Galeria, Curitiba, Brazilië
 Transformer, group exhibition at Upstream Gallery, Amsterdam
 The Extended Arms of the Transom, solo exhibition at David Risley Gallery, Kopenhagen
 Faith by Proxy, solo exhibition at Upstream Gallery, Amsterdam
2014
 ABC (Art Berlin Contemporary), met Upstream Gallery, Berlijn
 Christopher Crescent, Brussel
 Reforming Intervals, Laure Genillard, Londen
2013
 The Armory Show, solo met Upstream Gallery in New York
2012
 Painting without Paint, groepstentoonstelling bij David Risley Gallery, Kopenhagen
 Day's End, solotentoonstelling bij Upstream Gallery, Amsterdam
 Koninklijke Prijs voor de Schilderkunst '12, Koninklijk Paleis Amsterdam
 Nature/structure, Upstream Gallery op de Dutch Design Week Eindhoven
 PS, Co/Lab Los Angeles, Verenigde Staten
 Stereopsis, The Drawing Room, Tannery Arts Londen (met en gecureerd door Frank Ammerlaan e.a), Groot-Brittannië
 Land of the Seven Moles, PS Projectspace Amsterdam
 Graduation show, Royal College Of Art, Londen, Groot-Brittannië
 Mapping the Horizon, Upstream Gallery Amsterdam
2011
 Royal Prize of Painting '11, Koninklijk Paleis Amsterdam
 New Space, B&N Gallery, Londen, Groot-Brittannië
 Unlit, Solo show, PS, Amsterdam
 Zomeratelier 2011, CBK Zeeland
 Interim Show, Royal College of Art, Londen, Groot-Brittannië
 Life is Elsewhere, The Crypt Gallery, St Pancreas Church, Londen, Groot-Brittannië
 Pep, Post-Museum, Singapore
2010
 Koninklijke Prijs voor de Schilderkunst ’10, Koninklijk Paleis Amsterdam
 Und#6, Schwartz gallery, Londen, Groot-Brittannië
 Derivation, Skånes konstförening Malmö, Zweden
 Art Blossom, Brug 9, Amsterdam
 Magnitude, Alpineum produzentengalerie, Luzern, Zwitserland
 Amsterdam-Berlin, Forgotten bar, Berlijn, Duitsland
 Marsupial, Supermarket art fair, Kulturhuset Stockholm, Zweden
2009
 Let’s take it outside, ter ere van het tweejarige bestaan van De Service Garage, Amsterdam
 Koninklijke Prijs voor de Schilderkunst ’09, Koninklijk Paleis Amsterdam
 Quantum Vis V, RC De Ruimte & De Service Garage
 UND#5, Nice, Frankrijk
 .NL, DREI, Raum für Gegenwartskunst, Keulen, Duitsland
 Power to the paint, Arti & Amicitiae, Amsterdam
2008
 Koud, De Service Garage Amsterdam
 Three is a nice couple, De Veemvloer Amsterdam
 Uit De Tijd, De service Garage Amsterdam
 1141, Magnetic field, Galerie Gist Brummen
 Re-understandings, Kunstvlaai 7, De Service Garage Amsterdam
 Frank Ammerlaan & Michael Agacki, Horse Move Project Space Amsterdam
 Clup-ivoor, Art Rotterdam
2007
 De Service Garage Amsterdam
 Jong Talent, Artolive '07, zuiveringshal westergas Amsterdam
 Eindexamententoonstelling, Gerrit Rietveld Academie Amsterdam
 Clup-Ivoor, PAKT Amsterdam
 De Belofte, PAKT Amsterdam

References 
 Pressrelease Day's End, Upstream Gallery, 30 November 2012
 Snejana Krasteva, The Alchemy of a perennial threshold

External links 

 Website Frank Ammerlaan
 Website Upstream Gallery, representing Frank Ammerlaan
 Website De Service Garage

1979 births
Living people
Dutch contemporary artists
Gerrit Rietveld Academie alumni
Dutch expatriates in England
People from Teylingen